Favria is a monotypic genus of spread-wing skippers in the butterfly family Hesperiidae. This genus was formerly a synonym of Muschampia, and its only species, Favria cribrellum, was formerly a member of Muschampia. The species is commonly known as the spinose skipper.

The spinose skipper, a species of arid regions, is found in northern Hungary, Romania, Serbia, North Macedonia and Bulgaria, through the Ukraine, southern Russia, up to the Altai and the Amur region.

The length of the forewings is 13–16 mm. This species resembles Muschampia tessellum but is usually smaller, has larger white markings on the upper side of the wings and a distinctively yellow underside of the hindwing. Adults are on wing from May to June. There is one generation per year.

The larvae probably feed on Potentilla species.

References

Further reading

 </ref>

Carcharodini